Branchiostegus sawakinensis, the freckled tilefish, is a species of marine ray-finned fish, a tilefish belonging to the family Malacanthidae. It is native to the Indo-West Pacific area. From the Red Sea and south off Durban, South Africa. Also reported from the Arafura Sea, found in northwestern Australia and around the Philippines.

References

Malacanthidae
Taxa named by Chellappah Amirthalingam
Fish described in 1969